The WTA Premier Mandatory and Premier 5 tournaments, which are part of the WTA Premier tournaments, make up the elite tour for professional women's tennis organised by the WTA called the WTA Tour. There are four Premier Mandatory tournaments: Indian Wells, Miami, Madrid and Beijing and five Premier 5 tournaments: Doha, Rome, Canada, Cincinnati and Wuhan.

Tournaments

Results

See also 
 WTA Premier tournaments
 2018 WTA Tour
 2018 ATP Masters 1000
 2018 ATP Tour

References

External links 
 Women's Tennis Association (WTA) official website
 International Tennis Federation (ITF) official website

WTA 1000 tournaments

WTA Premier tournaments